The World Cup of Poker (WCP) was an annual poker tournament which was established in 2004. The preliminary rounds are conducted online, and the finals were initially held in Barcelona, Spain, but since 2009, they have been moved to the  Atlantis Resort & Casino in the Bahamas. The tournament is sponsored by PokerStars.com.

The tournament starts with 46 teams, each consisting of five players, from 39 countries, who compete in a series of heads up, or one-on-one, no limit Texas hold 'em poker tournaments. The teams are separated into eight regional groups, with each group competing for a spot at the finals where they play for $200,000 in cash prizes. It is a round robin tournament in which each team in a group plays each other team to determine who advances.

WCP Champions
2004: Team Costa Rica
2005: Team Costa Rica
2006: Team Poland
2007: Team United States - €100,000
2009: Team Germany - $100,000
2010: Team Chinese Taipei - $100,000
2011: Team Italy - $100,000
2012: Team Peru - $90,000
2013: Team Russia
2014: Team Spain

See also
World Championship of Online Poker
Full Tilt Online Poker Series

External links
Official site

Poker tournaments
PokerStars
poker